"The Dolphins" is a song written and recorded by American singer-songwriter Fred Neil and released in 1967. Writer Mark Brend described the song's lyrics as "ambivalent and elusive".

The song was frequently performed by Tim Buckley, who had been present during the song's recording. The song has also been recorded by Billy Bragg and Beth Orton.

References 

1967 songs
American folk songs
Songs written by Fred Neil